Aqbolagh (also Romanized as Āqbolāgh and Āq Bolāgh; also known as Āq Bolāq and Āq Bulāq) is a village in Sarab Rural District, in the Central District of Sonqor County, Kermanshah Province, Iran. At the 2006 census, its population was 976, in 212 families.

References 

Populated places in Sonqor County